Bread in Spain has an ancient tradition with various preparations in each region. Wheat is by far the most cultivated cereal, as it withstands the dry climate of the interior of the country. Since time immemorial, bread (pan in Spanish) is a staple food that accompanies all daily meals, all year round. In fact, the Iberian Peninsula is one of the European regions with the greatest diversity of breads. The simple  (followed by baguette and ciabatta) is, by far, the most consumed variety of bread (75%).

The Spanish gourmet  estimated a total of 315 varieties of bread in Spain. In addition to food, bread in Spain has a historical, cultural, religious and mythological function.

One of the hallmarks of the Spanish bakery is the candeal, bregado or sobado bread, which has a long tradition in Castile, Andalusia, Extremadura, Araba, Valencia or Zaragoza. This bread is made with  flour, a variety of durum wheat endemic to Iberia and the Balearic Islands (where it is called xeixa) and which is highly appreciated. The dough for this bread is obtained by squeezing the dough with a two-cylinder machine called bregadora (similar to pasta makers). The pan sobado bread is only found in Spain and Portugal (pão sovado).

Unlike the brown breads made in northern Europe, white flour is preferred in the South, because it provides a more spongy and light texture –but less nutritional value. This is also related to the universal prominence of wheat in Spanish bakery, while from the Pyrenees to the north it is more common to mix it with rye flour and other grains (like the French méteil), as well as the use of wholemeal flour. Wholemeal breads have only come to have some relevance in the recent history of the country, when a renewed interest in healthy diet is introduced. On the other hand, throughout its history (and especially during the Franco regime), rye, barley, buckwheat, or whole wheat breads were considered "food for the poor".

In addition, bread is an ingredient in a wide variety of Spanish recipes: ajoblanco, preñaos, migas, pa amb tomàquet, salmorejo, torrijas, etc. Traditional Spanish cuisine arose from the need to make the most of the few ingredients that have shaped the diet of the peninsula for centuries and centuries. Bread is the main of them, and especially in the inland. Historically, the Spanish have been renowned consumers of bread. However, the country has experienced an alarming decline in bread consumption, and reorientation of the Spanish bakery is noticeable. People eat less and worse bread, at the same time that the baker's job is becoming mechanized and tradition is simplifying.

History 
Bread was produced in the Iberian Peninsula before the arrival of the Romans. The Iberian people cultivated wheat, and possibly other cereals such as einkorn wheat and barley. They even mastered the fermentation process. The institution of bakeries as an establishment for sale to the public is due to the Greeks, and the Romans introduced significant improvements in structures such as the mill or the oven. Numerous  ('bread stamps') have been found throughout Hispania, such as in Córdoba or Ibiza. These were used by the Romans to "mark" bread for religious reasons. It is interesting to see that the pieces found in central Europe allude more to the imperial cult, while in Iberia more to Roman mythology.

In Rome, the fermentation was done by reusing dough that was left over from previous days (sourdough), however in Hispania, the natives had the custom of using beer foam as yeast, which resulted in lighter and fluffier breads. The writer and soldier Pliny the Elder, a Roman originally from northern Italy, served as a procurator for a while in the Iberian Peninsula and commented: "Hispania's bread is very light and very pleasing to the palate even for a refined man from Rome".

During the Andalusian period (from the 8th century to the 15th century), the cultivation of cereals was the dominant job and bread was a basic and daily food. In Al-Andalus, white bread was made from wheat flour, but also a coarser and cheaper bread that contained bran, called “red bread”. On the Christian side of the border, the baker's trade was established as a profession, becoming a relevant, prominent and respected figure in medieval society. To regulate the market, bakers began to form unions from the twelfth century. In Spain, especially in the Mediterranean area, there have been bakers' guilds for more than 750 years. For example, the Guild of Bakers of Barcelona is cited in a document from 1395.

The Spanish conquest of America led to the importation of a new cereal with which flour could be made: corn. Corn has a presence in the bakery of "Green Spain" (northern Spain). An example of bread with corn flour is boroña, brona or broa, a typical bread from Galicia, Asturias, Cantabria and the Basque Country.

List of Spanish breads 

This is a limited list of the most popular breads in Spain.

 Pan de payés (Pa de pagès in Catalan), from Catalonia
 Pan gallego (Pan galego in Galician), from Galicia
 Pan de Alfacar, in Andalusia
 Pan cateto, in Southern Andalusia
 Bollo, from Seville
 Candeal, bregado or sobado, from Castile and many other regions
 Cañada bread, a flatbread with olive oil, from Aragón
 Mollete, from Antequera, Málaga
 Pan de cruz, from Ciudad Real
 Pan de la Mota, from Mota del Cuervo, Cuenca
 Carrasca, from Murcia
 Pataqueta, from the Valencian Community
 Telera, from Córdoba
 Taja, from Navarre
 Colón and Fabiola, from Castile and Leon
 Llonguet, a roll from Catalonia and the Balearic Islands
 Francesilla, from Madrid
 Pistola, from Madrid
 Broa, boroña, from Northern Spain

Bread with toppings:

 Coca
 Regañao from Teruel
 Bollo de Requena, Valencia

Bread with fillings:

 Hornazo
 Galician empanada
 Bollo preñao

Sweet breads:

 Roscón de Reyes
 Jallulla, from Granada
 Pan de cañada, from Aragón
 Torta de Aranda
 Ensaimada, from Mallorca
 Toña, tonya, fogaza, fogassa, mona or panquemao
 Txantxigorri cake
 Pitufo, from Malaga

Bread and culture 

In addition to being a basic food, bread has a ritual function and a religious burden. In Christianity, bread embodies the body of Christ, and together with wine, which is his blood, make up the Eucharist in all Christian churches. Even before the appearance of the faith of Christ, the pagan traditions (Celtic, Greco-Roman, Phoenician, etc.) already considered bread as a symbol of fertility. For example, in Ancient Rome, pieces of bread were offered to Ceres, goddess of crops and fertility. In fact, Christianity absorbed many of these pagan traditions and also of Judaism, in which bread has a leading position.

Bread and fertility rites 

The egg is another food that many ancient cultures have associated with fertility, so it is not surprising that many ancestral traditions have survived to this day that, during spring (a season also associated with birth and life), embed whole eggs into the bread dough. This is the case of the Catalan monas, the Basque opillas or the Castilian San Marcos hornazo. The egg is tied to the bread with two intertwined strips of dough in the shape of a cross, definitively linking a pagan custom to Christian mythology.

Bread and death rites 
Bread has been present in funeral rites since ancient times. As a votive or mortuary offering, bread has embodied death in most cultures of the Mediterranean and beyond. Formerly, it was common at funerals to distribute loaves. According to the anthropologist Joan Amades "at funerals it was customary to offer rolls that the attendees gave to the priest, along with a candle". When a loved one died, "there should be bread in the house to facilitate the transit". 

In Catalonia, when the dead visit their families on All Souls' Day (November 2), they are offered a votive bread called pa d'ànimes ('bread of souls'), although nowadays panets and panellets are more typical. This tradition can be found in Mexico under the name "bread of the dead". In addition, in some Catalan towns, at the meal after the funeral, a bread with a cross in the middle is served, called pa de memòria, which was dedicated with a prayer to the deceased. The breads of the dead can be found throughout Spain and the Mediterranean, such as the pan de finado from the Canary Islands, the "saint's bones" from Madrid, or the anthropomorphic breads from Sicily and the south of the Italian peninsula.

Bread on the table 
In Spain, Christian families bless bread before beginning a meal, thanking God for "giving us our daily bread" while a cross is marked on the crust. Capel adds: "The first slice was not distributed, a gesture that would have meant the annulment of the rite." The good Christian gave the first piece of the loaf to the guests. The relevance of bread at the Christian table is reflected in the marks that are stamped on the loaves:  ("Long live the blessed bread"),  ("I am the main one at the table"),  ("Look at me attentively, I am your food"), etc. Wasting or throwing away a piece of bread was equivalent to despising or rejecting the food of the Lord.

Cultural loss and recovery policy 
Undoubtedly, bread has been the most consumed food in Spain throughout its history. Its prominence was overshadowed by the abundance of food that came to the country in the 1960s and 1970s, when agriculture was mechanized and the country opened up to the world. The reduction of its consumption has led to a loss of its quality, tradition and culture. According to culinary researcher  –who toured the 50 provinces collecting information on the country's baking tradition–: "Bread has lost prestige or, better said, it has been demystified, in the sense that it was sacred because it was what was eaten the most ( ...) Never has less bread been eaten than now." It goes hand in hand with a drastic reduction of the Mediterranean culinary tradition, just like in neighboring Italy.

Starting in the 2010s, a movement of renewed interest in traditional Spanish bakery began to take shape in the country. Although recent, this movement has already given rise to names such as Lucía Etxebarría from El Horno de Babette in Madrid, which has one of the YouTube channels on baking with the most subscriptions (in Spanish), or the Turris bakery chain in Barcelona, run by Xavier Barriga, author of several bakery books. Since 2017, Panàtics has organized the "Route through Spain of good bread" (Ruta del Buen Pan), an annual selection of one hundred artisan bakeries from all over Spain. Spanish law first approved a standard for bread quality on April 26, 2019 (Royal Decree 308/2919).

Influence of the Spanish bakery in the world

In Europe 
The candeal, bregado or sobado bread, originating in what is now Castile and León, would be taken to the south of the peninsula and to Portugal, where it has also been practiced since time immemorial; in Portuguese it is known as pão sovado in the north or pão de calo in the south.

The sobado bread was given to the soldiers because it has the exceptional characteristic of lasting for days, even weeks. It arrived in French Normandy through the Kingdom of Navarre in the times of Charles II 'the Bad', married to Joan of France. It gave rise to the so-called Norman pain brié (also, pain de chapître, 'town hall bread'), very similar to candeal. Later the Spanish Tercios brought sobado bread to France, Italy, Flanders and other parts of Europe. The Italian bakers adopted Spanish sobado bread and created its own delicacies, such as coppia ferrarese. Even in the Maghreb there is a bread derived from candeal called pain espagnole. Instead, what in Italy is called pan di Spagna ("Spanish bread") refers to the sponge cake, which according to Italian tradition was made by a baker in Spain. The name has passed into Greek as pantespani (Παντεσπάνι) and into Turkish as pandispanya.

In the Americas 

The Spanish bakery is the basis of the current Hispanic-American bakery, which later adapted the recipes to its climate, its ingredients and its own tastes.

Wheat was one of the first foods to be imported into the New World, and the culture of bread was one of the first that the Spanish colonization introduced into the diet of the natives, despite the fact that this food and nutritional niche was already occupied by corn. The massive cultivation of wheat in America also had a political reason, since the Spanish controlled in one way or another the production, distribution and sale of the product. The rejection of its cultivation was manifested as a form of resistance against Spanish rule. In Mesoamerica, for example, Antonio de Mendoza denounced that the indigenous people ignored the cultivation of wheat, among other things because they used the same techniques as for planting corn (with a coa) and wheat did not prosper. Even so, the culture of bread ended up adapting to America hand in hand with Evangelization.

Today the Hispanic bakery is spread throughout the Americas, and bread is a common food, with different variants depending on the country and region. For example:

 Spanish torrijas are also eaten in Argentina, Chile, Colombia and Costa Rica among other countries.
 In Mexico, a bread called telera has its remote origin in the telera that the Andalusian workers ate. Also in the Dominican Republic there is a telera, which is typical of Christmas.
 The acemita was a bread that was eaten in Spain and was considered of low quality because it was prepared with wheat bran (sometimes, if possible, it was mixed with a little white flour) The mixture itself was called , and with it the "poor man's bread" was made. Due to seseo, the term evolved to semita, which is what a wide variety of typical breads from different states of Mexico, as well as Honduras, Argentina or El Salvador are called.

Spanish East Indies 
The technology of baking bread in a kiln or oven (horno) was brought to the Spanish East Indies by the Spanish through New Spain (Mexico) in the 16th century. In 1625, a royal bakery was established in Intramuros. Aside from providing bread for Spanish settlers, it was also necessary for the production of the pan nava, a type of very hard long-lasting bread eaten by the crews of the Manila galleons; as well as sacramental bread for Spanish missionaries. They originally had a monopoly on bread production due to the necessity of importing wheat flour from China and Japan. But baking eventually spread to private households among the local aristocracy (the principalia) and finally to bakeries for the common people.

Though nativized over the centuries, a few staple breads of the Philippines have Spanish origins. These include the pan de sal (originally derived from a local baguette-like bread called the pan de suelo), the ensaymada, and the pan de monja.

See also 

 Bread in Europe
 Bread in culture
 History of bread

Notes

References

Bibliography

External links 
 A guide to Spanish breads. Expatica. Retrieved on February 5, 2022
 10 Most Popular Spanish Breads. TasteAtlas. Retrieved on February 5, 2022
 A tour of Spanish breads, by Jorge Roman. GuideCollective. Retrieved on February 5, 2022

 
Food and drink culture